Cords Cable Industries Limited (BSE: 532941, NSE: CORDSCABLE, ISIN: INE792I01017) is the largest instrumentation cable maker in India.

With its headquarters in New Delhi, it manufactures instrumentation cables, control cables, thermocouple cables, power cables and  special cables for signaling and electrical connectivity requirements, mainly for industrial use. The company manufactures cables up to 1.1 kilovolt for applications including industrial, utility and buildings. It caters to industries such as electric power, steel, cement, fertilizers and chemicals, and refinery/petroleum. The Company’s products include low-tension control cables (up to 1.1 kilovolt), low-tension power cables (up to 1.1 kilovolt), instrumentation cables, signal and data cables, thermocouple extension/compensating cables, panel wires/house hold wires/flexible cables, and specialty cables.

Naveen Sawhney is the Managing Director, and Chairman of the Board of the company.

Listing
In January 2008, the Company came out with an IPO and on 13 February 2008 got listed on Bombay Stock Exchange and National Stock Exchange of India.

Rankings
In 2008, Cords Cable Industries Limited became the only Cable manufacturer in the Asia-Pacific Region to be listed by Forbes magazine in its 'Asia's 200 Best Companies Under a Billion List'.

In 2012, Cords Cable Industries Limited was ranked 513th by International Business Times in its list, published on 16 January 2012, of world's 1000 fasted-growing companies.

References

External links
Company's logo
List of Officers and Directors
Corporate website

Wire and cable manufacturers
Multinational companies
Manufacturing companies based in Delhi
Indian brands
Indian companies established in 1987
Companies listed on the National Stock Exchange of India
Companies listed on the Bombay Stock Exchange